The 2013–14 SSV Jahn Regensburg season was the 107th season in the club's football history. In 2013–14 the club played in the 3. Liga, the third tier of German football. The club was relegated from the 2. Bundesliga in this league. Regensburg finished the league in 11th place.

The club also took part in the 2013–14 edition of the DFB-Pokal, the German Cup, and lost in the first round to 2. Bundesliga team 1. FC Union Berlin.

Review and events
Regensburg was relegated from the 2. Bundesliga and manager Franciszek Smuda said that he would not coach in the 3. Liga. So on 11 June 2013, it was announced that Thomas Stratos will take over the job a manager.

Jahn Regensburg took part in the 2013–14 Bavarian Cup where the two finalists qualify for the 2014–15 DFB-Pokal. Regensburg won in the first round against FC Laimerstadt with 11–0, but lost in the second round to three tier lower SV Sportfreunde Dinkelsbühl with 3–4. This means that Regensburg has to reach at least the fourth place in the league in order to qualify for the DFB-Pokal.

Matches

Legend

Friendly matches

3. Liga

DFB-Pokal

Squad

Squad and statistics

Squad, matches played and goals scored

Transfers

In

Out

Sources

External links
 2013–14 SSV Jahn Regensburg season at Weltfussball.de 
 2013–14 SSV Jahn Regensburg season at kicker.de 
 2013–14 SSV Jahn Regensburg season at Fussballdaten.de 

Jahn Regensburg
SSV Jahn Regensburg seasons